John A. Toolan Jr. (born January 28, 1954) is a retired United States Marine Corps lieutenant general, whose final post was as the Commanding General, United States Marine Corps Forces, Pacific.

Marine Corps career
Toolan joined the United States Marine Corps in 1976, and graduated from the Basic School in April 1977. His first assignment was with the 1st Battalion, 9th Marines in Okinawa, Japan. After three years service at the Marine Corps Recruit Depot, San Diego, he served as company commander of Golf Company, 2nd Battalion, 7th Marines from 1982 to 1984.

Toolan saw service in the Gulf War in 1991 before taking command of the 3rd Light Armored Reconnaissance Battalion at Marine Corps Air Ground Combat Center Twentynine Palms, California. He also served on the Supreme Allied Headquarters in Europe.

In 2003, Toolan served as the Chief of Staff for 1st Marine Division during the march to Baghdad as part of the Iraq War, serving under Major General James Mattis. In 2004, he commanded 1st Marine Regiment during the First Battle of Fallujah.

From March 2011 to March 2012, Toolan commanded Regional Command Southwest during the War in Afghanistan.

He also served as Director of Command and Staff College at Marine Corps Base Quantico, Virginia, and, in September 2012, he took command of I Marine Expeditionary Force. Toolan retired from the Marine Corps on October 1, 2016.

Awards, honors and decorations

References

1954 births
Living people
United States Marine Corps generals
United States Marine Corps officers
Recipients of the Legion of Merit
Recipients of the Defense Superior Service Medal
United States Marine Corps personnel of the Gulf War
United States Marine Corps personnel of the Iraq War
United States Marine Corps personnel of the War in Afghanistan (2001–2021)